Zakaria Aboukhlal (born 18 February 2000) is a professional footballer who plays as forward for Ligue 1 club Toulouse. Born in the Netherlands, he plays for the Morocco national team, having previously played for the Netherlands at various youth levels.

Club career
Aboukhlal made his professional debut for Jong PSV in a 2–1 Eerste Divisie win over FC Eindhoven on 17 August 2018.

In August 2019, after making only two appearances for PSV's senior side, Aboukhlal transferred to Eredivisie rivals AZ Alkmaar in a deal worth €2 million. In a match for Jong AZ on 9 December 2019, he scored all four of his team's goals in a win against Helmond Sport.

On 24 June 2022, Aboukhlal signed with French club Toulouse.

International career
Born in the Netherlands, Aboukhlal was born to a Moroccan mother and Libyan father. He is a former youth international for the Netherlands. He decided not to represent the Netherlands but the Morocco national team because of his growing up among the Moroccan community residing in the Netherlands, he was called up to represent in November 2020. He was called up for the Libyan National Team but refused. Aboukhlal debuted for Morocco in a 4–1 2021 Africa Cup of Nations qualification win over Central African Republic on 13 November 2020, and scored his side's fourth goal in his debut.

On 10 November 2022, he was named in Morocco's 23-man squad for the 2022 FIFA World Cup in Qatar. He scored his first goal in the World Cup against Belgium on 27 November 2022.

Career statistics
Scores and results list Morocco's goal tally first, score column indicates score after each Aboukhlal goal.

References

External links
 Career stats -  Voetbal International
 
 Ons Oranje O19 Profile
 Ons Oranje O18 Profile
 Ons Oranje O17 Profile

2000 births
Living people
Footballers from Gorinchem
Moroccan footballers
Dutch footballers
Morocco international footballers
Association football forwards
Netherlands youth international footballers
Moroccan people of Libyan descent
Dutch people of Libyan descent
Dutch sportspeople of Moroccan descent
PSV Eindhoven players
Jong PSV players
AZ Alkmaar players
Jong AZ players
Toulouse FC players
Eredivisie players
Eerste Divisie players
Ligue 1 players
2021 Africa Cup of Nations players
2022 FIFA World Cup players
Moroccan expatriate footballers
Moroccan expatriate sportspeople in France
Expatriate footballers in France